Rayburn may refer to:

People

Places

United States

Municipalities
 Rayburn, Alabama
 Rayburn, Georgia
 Rayburn, Texas
 Rayburn, West Virginia
 Rayburn Township, Pennsylvania

Structures
 Rayburn House Office Building, a Congressional building

Arts, entertainment, and media
Rayburn House, the fictional beachside inn owned by the Rayburn family on the Netflix series Bloodline

Brands
 Rayburn range, a stove cooker from AGA

See also 
 Raeburn
 Deanna Raybourn